Corollonema is a species of plants in the Apocynaceae first described as a genus in 1914. It contains only one known species, Corollonema boliviense, native to Argentina and Bolivia.

References

Asclepiadoideae
Flora of South America
Monotypic Apocynaceae genera